Paul David Barrett (born 13 April 1978) is an English former footballer who played in the Football League for Wrexham.

References

External links
 
 England profile at TheFA

1978 births
Living people
English footballers
Newcastle United F.C. players
Wrexham A.F.C. players
Blyth Spartans A.F.C. players
English Football League players
Association football midfielders